Abdullah Al Mutairi is a Kuwaiti football manager who recently managed Nepal men's national football team. He is also the head coach of the Nepal men's national football team for 2022 FIFA World Cup qualification (AFC). Besides Nepal, he has also managed Kyrgyzstan national under-17 football team.

Career

He announced to resign on 25 July 2021 blaming internal politics on social media. As per Abdullah Al Mutairi's request All Nepal Football Association requested the Youth and Sports Ministry to conduct investigation. He led Nepal men's national football team to the Final of the SAFF Championship where they lost against India.

Managerial statistics

References

1982 births
Kuwaiti football managers
Expatriate football managers in Kyrgyzstan
Expatriate football managers in Nepal
Living people
Nepal national football team managers
Kuwaiti expatriate football managers
Kuwaiti expatriate sportspeople in Nepal
Kuwaiti expatriate sportspeople in Kyrgyzstan
Kuwaiti expatriate sportspeople in Saudi Arabia
Kuwaiti expatriate sportspeople in Qatar
Expatriate football managers in Saudi Arabia
Expatriate football managers in Qatar